Galina Fokina (born 17 January 1984) is a Russian former tennis player.

Fokina has won a total of 35 titles on the ITF Women's Circuit. Her career-high WTA rankings are world number 168 in singles and number 79 in doubles, both achieved in 2002.

In 2004, she took part in the Hyderabad Open but lost in the second round of the WTA Tour event to Marion Bartoli.

Fokina retired from professional tennis in 2013.

WTA career finals

Doubles: 1 (1 runner-up)

ITF Circuit finals

Singles (11–5)

Doubles (24–12)

References

 "Kournikova Loses in 1st Round of Kremlin Cup", The Moscow Times, 4 October 2001 (Reuters)
 "Галина Фокина (Galina Fokina). WTA", GoTennis.ru

External links
 
 

1984 births
Living people
Tennis players from Moscow
Russian female tennis players
US Open (tennis) junior champions
Grand Slam (tennis) champions in girls' doubles
21st-century Russian women
20th-century Russian women